Cochylimorpha erlebachi is a species of moth of the family Tortricidae. It is found in the Alps of France and Italy.

References

Moths described in 1997
Cochylimorpha
Moths of Europe